The Ministry of Children, Community and Social Services is the ministry in Ontario, Canada responsible for services to children and youth, social services such as welfare, the Ontario Disability Support Program, and community service programs to address homelessness, domestic violence, spousal support, adoption, and assisted housing for people with disabilities. The current Minister of Children, Community and Social Services is Merrilee Fullerton.

Ontario Works 

Ontario Works is a last-resort income support program for the poor.  Prior to 1997, persons requiring this assistance received support under the General Welfare Assistance Act.  While the Ontario Works program purports to better respect peoples dignity, build self-esteem and promote independence, its origins are in the Ontario Works Act, 1997 as a workfare programme under the Mike Harris government. Each of its participants is encouraged to be involved more in the community and find suitable employment.

Ontario Works is a program that provides income and employment assistance for people who are in financial need by developing an Action Plan in certain agencies. In other agencies participants are referred to other resources. This Plan identifies and addresses an individual's barriers to employment. It is a benefit for persons 18 years and older and by exception for peoples 16 to 18 and also single parents regardless of age.  In order to qualify for Ontario Works, an applicant must be a resident of the province of Ontario, in immediate need of financial help, not have excessive assets and be a willing participant in employment assistance programs and activities.

There are exceptions to participating in employment related activities if the participant is unable to work due to medical reasons or if they are the primary caregiver for a relative. The amount of money received from Ontario Works will depend on family size, income, assets, and housing costs. Those eligible for Ontario Works may be able to receive other benefits such as medical and dental coverage, eyeglasses, moving or eviction costs and employment-related costs.

Ontario Works also assists applicants for the Ontario Disability Supports Program (ODSP) by providing immediate financial assistance, application for ODSP and advocacy in the appeal process. Applications for Social Assistance in Ontario can now be completed online at; https://saapply.mcss.gov.on.ca/CitizenPortal/cw/PlayerPage.do. Eligibility can also be determined at the same link without directly applying.

In 2014, a $240-million Social Assistance Management System (SAMS) software platform deployed by IBM's Cúram Software caused $20 million of overpayments to 17,000 Ontario Works or Ontario Disability Support Program (OW/ODSP) recipients, while thousands of others received token $5 monthly payments or nothing at all.  Some were unable to pay for rent or electricity, in some cases leading to their eviction. Others were manually issued paper cheques.

Juvenile corrections 
The ministry operates correctional facilities for juveniles who are convicted of crimes.

Secure juvenile facilities include:

 Arrell Youth Centre (Hamilton, Ontario) 
 Bluewater Youth Centre (Goderich) (This Youth Centre has shut down in 2012)
 Brookside Youth Centre (Cobourg) (This Youth Centre has shut down in 2021)
 Camp Dufferin (hidden location)
 Donald Doucet Youth Centre (Sault Ste. Marie)
 Cecil Facer Youth Centre (Greater Sudbury)
 Kennedy House Youth Centre (Ajax)
 Portage Youth Centre (Kenora)
 Peninsula Youth Centre (Fenwick, Ontario)
 Ge-Da-Gi-Binez Youth Centre (Fort Frances)
 William E. Hay Youth Centre (Ottawa)
 Justice Ronald Lester Youth Centre (Thunder Bay)
 Roy McMurtry Youth Centre (Brampton)
 Syl Apps Youth Centre (Oakville)
 Sprucedale Youth Centre (Simcoe)

Ministry Agencies 

 Autism Spectrum Disorders Clinical Expert Committee 
 Community Opportunities Advocate 
 Council of The Ontario College of Social Workers and Social Service Workers
 Premier's Council on Equality of Opportunity 
 Soldier's Aid Commission

List of ministers

Public Welfare
 William Martin, 1930-1934
 David Croll, 1934-1937
 Mitchell Hepburn, 1937 (April–October)
 Eric Cross, 1937-1940
 Farquhar Oliver, 1941-1942
 Harold James Kirby, 1942-1943
 Farquhar Oliver, 1943 (May–August)
 Percy Vivian, 1943-1946
 Bill Goodfellow, 1946-1955
 Louis-Pierre Cécile, 1955-1966
 John Yaremko, 1966-1967

Social and Family Services
 John Yaremko, 1967-1971
 Thomas Leonard Wells, 1971-1972
 René Brunelle, 1972 (February–April)

Community and Social Services
 René Brunelle, 1972-1975
 James A. Taylor, 1975–1977
 Keith Norton, 1977–1981
 Frank Drea, 1981–1985
 Bruce McCaffrey, 1983–1983
 Robert Elgie, 1985 (Feb 8 – May 17)
 Ernie Eves, 1985 (May 17 – June 26)
 John Sweeney, 1985–1989
 Charles Beer, 1989–1990
 Zanana Akande, 1990–1991
 Marion Boyd, 1991–1993
 Tony Silipo, 1993–1995
 David Tsubouchi, 1995–1996
 Janet Ecker, 1996–1999
 John Baird, 1999–2002
 Brenda Elliott, 2002–2003 (as Minister of Community, Family and Children's Services)
 Sandra Pupatello, 2003–2006
 Madeleine Meilleur, 2006–2011
 John Milloy, 2011–2013
 Ted McMeekin, 2013–2014
 Helena Jaczek, 2014–2018
 Michael Coteau, 2018-2018

Children and Youth Services 

 Marie Bountrogianni, 2003-2005 (was Children's Services from 2003-2004)
 Mary Anne Chambers, 2005-2007
 Deb Matthews, 2007-2009
 Laurel Broten, 2009-2011
 Eric Hoskins, 2011-2012
 Laurel Broten, 2012-2013
 Teresa Piruzza, 2013-2014
 Tracy MacCharles, 2014-June 2016
 Michael Coteau, 2016–June 2018

Children, Community and Social Services
 Lisa MacLeod, 2018-2019
 Todd Smith, 2019-2021
 Merrilee Fullerton, 2021-

See also
Family Responsibility Office

References

External links
 Minister's Biography
 Ontario Works Act

Community and Social Services
Ontario
Childhood in Canada